Udaisagar Lake, one of the five prominent lakes of Udaipur, is situated around 13 km in the east of Udaipur. This lake was built by Maharana Udai Singh in 1565. Udai Sagar Lake is around 4 km in length, 2.5 km in width and 9 meters deep at the maximum. It is fed by the Ahar River.

History 
In 1559, Maharana Udai Singh constructed a dam on Berach River to ensure adequate supply of water in his kingdom. Udai Sagar Lake was developed as an outcome of this dam. This dam at Udaisagar Lake drains about 479 km2, and covers an area of 10.5 km2.

Threats to the lake 
According to a study made on the environmental pollution of Udaisagar, Udai sagar lake's water revealed high phosphate contents, due to discharge of pollutants from surrounding phosphorite mines, chemical factories, distillery, sewage and domestic waste from settlements and  hotels. All these pollutants, reaching this lake through the River Ahar, make the water unhygienic for human consumption and unfavourable for survival of aquatic life.

Lake restoration works 
The task of restoration and transformation of the Lake Udai Sagar and Goverdhan Sagar is taken up by National Lake Conservation Program (NLCP). Udaipur is the first city in the state where all 4 lakes will be developed under the NLCP.

The key undertakings under this program include: 
 Curbing pollution in the lakes.
 Restrictions on disposal of waste products and sewerage in the lakes. 
 Restrictions on mining activities in the catchment areas.
 Conservation of wildlife around the lakes. 
 Protection of birds as well as heritage properties.

See also
 List of dams and reservoirs in India
 List of lakes in India
 Udaipur
 Tourist Attractions in Udaipur

References 

Reservoirs in Rajasthan
Lakes of Udaipur
Tourist attractions in Udaipur
1565 establishments in India